Urs Christian Timotheus Guldimann known as Tim Guldimann (born September 19, 1950) is a Swiss former diplomat and retired politician. Since 2021 he additionally holds German citizenship. Guldimann served in several posts representing Switzerland, including in Iran, where he served as a liaison between the country and the United States. He represented Zürich as member of the National Council—the first elected while living outside the country, in Berlin—from 2015 until his resignation in March 2018.

Diplomatic career 
Guldimann began working for the Federal Department of Foreign Affairs in 1982, retiring in 1991. From 1996 to 1999, worked as negotiator for the Organization for Security and Co-operation in Europe in Croatia and Chechnya.

Guldimann re-entered the Swiss foreign service as Swiss ambassador to Iran from 1997 to 2004. During his term, in May 2003, he relayed a document to the U.S. that he said was written by Sadegh Kharazi, the nephew of Iran's then-foreign minister Kamal Kharazi (Switzerland represents the United States in Tehran). The document, known as the Schweizer Memorandum (de) in German, laid out a proposal to begin discussions over a large range of issues in Iran–United States relations. Guldimann was distrusted by a number of figures in the administration of George W. Bush, including Richard Armitage, who suspected Guldimann may have authored large amounts of the document on his own.

Guldimann was appointed OSCE Envoy to Ukraine in 2014. He was criticized by some American and European diplomats for his perceived pro-Russian bias.

Political career 
Guldimann served for two-and-a-half years as a member of the National Council, representing Zürich for the Social Democratic Party Social Democratic Party of Switzerland before resigning in March 2018. He was the first Swiss legislator elected while living abroad, in Berlin, where he had previously served as Swiss ambassador to Germany. He remained as an expatriate in Berlin while serving as a National Councillor. After his resignation, his seat was succeeded by Fabian Molina.

References 

Living people
Swiss politicians
Swiss diplomats
Politicians from Zürich
1950 births
Ambassadors to Iran
Social Democratic Party of Switzerland politicians
Members of the National Council (Switzerland)